This is a list of beaches of the world, sorted by country. A beach is a landform along the shoreline of an ocean, sea, lake, or river. It usually consists of loose particles, which are often composed of rock, such as sand, gravel, shingle, pebbles, or cobblestones. Beaches typically occur in areas along the coast where wave or current action deposits and reworks sediments. The particles comprising a beach are occasionally biological in origin, such as mollusc shells or coralline algae.

Afghanistan
 Qargha Reservoir

Albania

 Borsh
 Durrës
 Dhërmi
 Gjipe
 Golemi
 Himara
 Kavaja
 Shkëmbi i Kavajës
 Ksamil
 Palasë
 Piqeras
 Sandbar
 Shëngjin
 Velipojë

Algeria

 Beni Haoua Beach

Angola

 Baía Azul
 Coatinha beach in Benguela

Antigua and Barbuda
There are 365 beaches on Antigua.  The following are some of beaches in Antigua and Barbuda:
Cocoa Point beach, Barbuda, 
Devil's Bridge beach, Saint Philip, Antigua and Barbuda, 
Eden beach, near Five Islands, Antigua, 
Five Islands beach, Antigua
Galleon beach, 
Half Moon Bay, SE coast, Antigua
Jolly beach, Saint Mary, Antigua 
 Little Ffryes Beach, Antigua
Pigeon cliff beach, Barbuda, 
Pink sand beach, Barbuda, 
Runaway Beach, Dickenson Bay, Runaway Bay, Antigua

Argentina

 Cariló
 Las Grutas
 Mar de las Pampas
 Mar del Plata
 Mar del Sur
 Miramar
 Monte Hermoso
 Necochea
 Pinarmar
 Playa Union
 Puerto Madryn
 Puerto Piramides
 Rada Tilly
 San Clemente del Tuyú
 Villa Gesell

Source: Argentina's Travel Guide — Beaches

Australia

New South Wales

 Avalon Beach (Northern Beaches)
 Bondi Beach
 Bronte Beach
 Coogee Beach
 Cronulla Beach
 Dee Why Beach
 Lady Robinsons Beach
 Manly Beach
 Maroubra Beach
 Palm Beach
 Tamarama
 Hyams Beach
 Duranbah Beach, Tweed Heads
 Byron Bay
 Casuarina Beach, Tweed Heads
 Central Coast

Northern Territory
 Mindil Beach, Northern Territory

Queensland

 Coolangatta, southern Gold Coast
 Four Mile Beach
 Gold Coast, Queensland
 Mermaid Beach, Gold Coast
 Mooloolaba, Sunshine Coast
 Palm Cove
 Rainbow Beach
 Shark Island, Cronulla Beach
 Sunrise Beach
 Sunshine Beach
 Surfers Paradise, Gold Coast
 Trinity Beach
 Whitehaven Beach

South Australia

 Aldinga Beach
 Baudin Beach
 Christies Beach
 The Coorong, the longest in Australia
 Henley Beach
 Island Beach
 Maslin Beach
 Middle Beach
 O'Sullivan Beach
 Sellicks Beach
 West Beach

Victoria

 Bells Beach, Torquay
 Bridgewater Bay
 Discovery Bay
 Lorne
 Mattsass Beach
 Ninety Mile Beach

Western Australia
 Cable Beach
 Eighty Mile Beach
 Lucky Bay
 Cottesloe Beach, Cottesloe

Azerbaijan

 Astara, Azerbaijan
 Bilgah
 Nabran
 Novkhani
 Pirşağı
 Shikhov Beach
 Zağulba Bağları

Bahamas
 Paradise Island

Bahrain

Bangladesh

Barbados

Belgium

Belize
 

Mainland beaches
 Cerros Beach (a mini Tulum)
 Gales Point Lagoon
 Almond Beach, Hopkins
 Honey Camp Lagoon
 Maya Beach, Placencia
 Monkey River Beach
 Sarteneja

Popular cayes
 Blackadore Caye
 Caye Caulker
 Caye Chapel
 Goff's Caye
 Half Moon Caye
 Laughing Bird Caye
 St. George's Caye
 San Pedro Town, Ambergris Caye
 Sapodilla Cayes
 Tobacco Caye

Brazil

Brunei
 Muara beach

Bulgaria

 Albena
 Bolata
 Golden Sands
 Sunny Beach

Cambodia

Sihanoukville Beaches
Sihanoukville Island Beaches

Cameroon

 Kribi Beach
 Limbe Beach

Canada

Cape Verde

 Cabo de Santa Maria – has a 10 km beach
 Flamengos
 Praia Grande
 Tarrafal

Chile
 Anakena (Easter Island)

Far north

 Arica
 Antofagasta
 Bahía Inglesa
 La Rinconada
 Punta Rieles

Near north

 Guanaqueros
 Morrillos
 La Herradura
 La Serena
 Las Tacas
 Las Tórtolas
 Peñuelas

Central Chile

 La Puntilla
 Las Terrazas
 Chorrillos
 Infiernillo
 Hermosa
 Reñaca

Southern Chile

 Cole Cole
 Chaihuín
 Chica
 La Barra
 Coique
 Colún
 Curiñanco
 de Los Enamorados
 Grande
 Los Molinos
 Pilolcura

China

 Xichong, Shenzhen
 Yalong Bay, Hainan

Hong Kong

Colombia

 Bahía Solano
 Bocagrande in Cartagena
 Malpelo Island
 San Andrés - an island
 Tayrona National Natural Park

Comoros
 Le Galawa Beach – located in Mitsamiouli, Grande Comore, at the Le Galawa Beach Hotel

Costa Rica

Guanacaste Province

 Gulf of Papagayo
 Montezuma
 Nosara
 Playa Grande
 Playa Negra
 Playa Tamarindo
 Santa Teresa

Limon Province

 Cahuita National Park
 Puerto Viejo de Talamanca
 Tortuguero, Costa Rica
 Tortuguero National Park

Puntarenas Province

 Carmen Beach
 Jacó, Costa Rica
 Manuel Antonio National Park
 Playa Blanca
 Playa Herradura
 Puntarenas

Croatia

Brela, southern Dalmatia
Banj beach, Šibenik, northern Dalmatia
Nugal Beach, Makarska Riviera, southern Dalmatia
Pasjača Beach, near Cavtat, Konavle Region, the 2020 most beautiful beach of Europe
Sahara Beach, Lopar, Island of Rab
Zlatni Rat, Bol, Island of Brač
Zrće, near Novalja, Island of Pag

Cuba

Varadero

Cyprus

Coral Bay
Faros beach
Fig Tree Bay
Nissi beach

Denmark

 Amager Strand, Copenhagen
 Balka Strand, Bornholm
 Bisnap Strand, North Jutland Island
 Dueodde, Bornholm
 Fanø Bad, Fanø
 Gudmindrup Strand, northern Zealand
 Hornbæk Strand, Nordsjælland
 Marielyst Strand, Falster
 Råbylille Strand, Møn
 Skagen Strand, North Jutland Island
 Skallerup Klit, North Jutland Island
 Smørmosen Strand, Thurø
 Vesterø Strand, Læsø

Ecuador

Egypt

Dahab
Gamasa
Hurghada
Maamoura Beach, Alexandria
Mersa Matruh
Ras El Bar
Sharm el-Sheikh
Sidi Abdel Rahman
Taba

El Salvador
Costa del Sol
La Libertad
Playa El Cuco
Playa El Majahual
Playa El Sunzal
Playa El Tunco
Playa El Zonte
Playa San Diego

Estonia

Fiji
Yanuca – an island with white sandy beaches and lush vegetation

Finland

Hietaniemi beach
Kangasjärvi – a small lake with a small beach
Koitere – a large lake with many beaches
Ruissalo – an island in the Archipelago Sea with a beach in its southwest
Yyteri one of the longest sand beaches in Nordics

France

 Porto-Vecchio, Corsica
 Le Diamant, Martinique
 Argelès-sur-Mer, Pyrénées-Orientales
 Banyuls-sur-Mer, Pyrénées-Orientales
 Canet-en-Roussillon, Pyrénées-Orientales
 La Grande-Motte, Hérault
 Collioure, Pyrénées-Orientales
 Saint-Cyprien, Pyrénées-Orientales
 Biarritz, Pyrénées-Atlantiques
 Hossegor, Landes
 Mimizan, Landes
 Biscarrosse, Landes
 Arcachon, Gironde
 Cap Ferret, Gironde
 Lacanau, Gironde
 Royan, Charente-Maritime
 La Baule-Escoublac, Loire-Atlantique
 Quiberon, Morbihan
 Deauville, Calvados
 Le Touquet, Pas-de-Calais
 Bora Bora, French Polynesia
 Teahupo'o, French Polynesia

Gambia

Bakau
Fajara
Kololi

Georgia

Anaklia beaches
Batumi beaches
Chakvi, Gonio
Gagra
Kobuleti beaches
Sukhumi
Ureki

Germany

Baltic Sea
 Amber Beach
 Binz Beach
 Boltenhagen Beach
 Darss West Beach
 Glücksburg Beach
 Göhren Beach
 Heiligendamm Beach
 Kaiser Beach
 Kühlungsborn Beach
 Laboe Beach
 Lubmin Beach
 Sellin Beach
 Timmendorfer Strand
 Travemünde Beach
 Warnemünde Beach
 Zingst Beach

North Sea
 Amrum Beach
 Baltrum Beach
 Cuxhaven Beach
 Heligoland Beach
 Juist Beach
 Norderney Beach
 Pellworm Beach
 Spiekeroog Beach
 St. Peter-Ording Beach
 Sylt Beach

Ghana
Labadi Beach

Greece

Gytheio, Laconia — Mani
Milos Island Beaches
Rhodes
Valtos Beach, Parga
Zacharo

Guatemala
Monterrico

Haiti

 Jacmel, Sud-Est
 Labadee, Cap-Haïtien
 Montrouis, Artibonite
 Port-Salut, Sud

Hungary
Balatonberény

India

Indonesia

Iran
Bandar-e Anzali, Caspian Sea
Babolsar, Caspian Sea
Kiashahr, Caspian Sea
Langarud, Caspian Sea
Rasht, Caspian Sea
Hormuz Island

Ireland

 Ballybunion, County Kerry
 Ballyheigue, County Kerry
 Banna Strand, County Kerry
 Barleycove, County Cork
 Bray, County Wicklow
 Brittas Bay, County Wicklow
 Bundoran, County Donegal
 Cappa Pier, Kilrush, County Clare
 Enniscrone, County Sligo
 Fanore, County Clare
 Gurteen Beach, County Galway
 Inchydoney Beach, County Cork
 Kells Bay, County Kerry
 Kilkee, County Clare
 Lahinch, County Clare
 Laytown, County Meath
 Myrtleville, County Cork
 Quilty Beach, Quilty, County Clare
 Rosscarbery, County Cork
 Sherkin Island, County Cork
 Spanish Point, County Clare
 Rossnowlagh, County Donegal
 Boyeeghter Bay, County Donegal
 Tramore, County Waterford
 White Strand, Milltown Malbay, County Clare
 Youghal, County Cork

Israel

Italy

Ivory Coast

Assinie

Jamaica
Negril

Japan

Gappo Park
Kujukuri Beach
Tenjin Beach
Tenno Beach

Jordan
Aqaba – has beach resorts
 Beach clubs exist at the Dead Sea and Aqaba

Kenya

Diani Beach, Kwale County

Kiribati

Aranuka
Birnie Island
Nakaa Beach
Teraina

North Korea

South Korea

Gwangalli Beach, Busan
Haeundae Beach, Busan

Lebanon

 Byblos Beach
 Chekka Beach
 El Mina
 Tabarja Beach
 Tyre Beach Natural Reserve

Madagascar

Belo sur Mer
Canal des Pangalanes – beaches along a series of man made canals linking natural lakes and rivers running down the east coast of Madagascar
Ifaty beach – near Toliara
Mahajanga

Malaysia

 Bachok, Kelantan
 Batu Ferringhi, Penang
 Cherating Beach, Pahang
 Hawaii Beach, Miri
 Kapas Island, Terengganu
 Lang Tengah Island, Terengganu
 Langkawi Island, Kedah
 Lutong Beach, Miri
 Mabul Island, Sabah
 Pangkor Island, Perak
 Pantai Cahaya Bulan, Kelantan
 Pantai Sri Tujoh, Kelantan
 Perhentian Islands, Terengganu
 Port Dickson, Negeri Sembilan
 Rantau Abang Beach, Terengganu
 Redang Island, Terengganu
 Tanjong Lobang Beach, Miri
 Telok Cempedak Beach, Pahang
 Tenggol Island, Terengganu
 Tioman Island, Pahang
 Tok Bali, Kelantan

Maldives

Malta
See also: 

 Anchor Bay, Popeye Village, Mellieħa
 Armier Bay, Marfa, Mellieħa
 Blue Lagoon, Comino
 Għajn Tuffieħa, Mġarr
 Golden Bay, Manikata, Mellieħa
 Ġnejna Bay, Mġarr
 Marsalforn, Żebbuġ, Gozo
 Mellieħa Bay or (Għadira Beach), Mellieħa
 Mistra, Xemxija, San Pawl il-Baħar
 Paradise Bay (Malta), Ċirkewwa, Mellieħa
 Pretty Bay, Birżebbuġa
 Pwales Beach, Xemxija, San Pawl il-Baħar
 Ramla Bay, Xagħra, Gozo
 San Blas, Nadur, Gozo
 Santa Maria Bay, Comino
 St. George's Bay, Birżebbuġa
 St. George's Bay, Paceville, San Ġiljan
 St. Paul's Bay, Buġibba, San Pawl il-Baħar
 St. Thomas Bay, Marsaskala
 Xlendi, Munxar, Gozo

Mauritius

Flic en Flac
La Preneuse
Trou-aux-Biches
Grand Baie

Mexico

Micronesia
Taga Beach – in Tinian, one of the three principal islands of the Commonwealth of the Northern Mariana Islands
Uruno Beach in Guam

Montenegro

 Ada Bojana, Ulcinj
 Bečići, Budva
 Buljarica, Budva
 Crvena Plaža, Bar
 Drobni Pijesak, Budva
 Gradska Plaža, Bar
 Jaz Beach, Budva
 Kamenovo, Budva
 Kraljičina Plaža, Budva
 Ladies Beach
 Liman, Ulcinj
 Liman II, Ulcinj
 Mala Plaža, Ulcinj
 Miločer, Budva
 Mogren, Budva
 Petrovac
 Ploče, Budva
 Pržno, Budva
 Slovenska Plaza, Budva
 Sutomore, Bar
 Sveti Stefan, Budva
 Trsteno, Budva
 Velika Plaža, Ulcinj
 Žukotrlica, Bar

Morocco

Agadir
Essaouira
Saïdia

Mozambique
Vamizi Island

Myanmar

 Chaungtha Beach, Ayeyarwady Region
 Kan Thar Yar Beach, Rakhine State
 Maungmagan Beach, Tanintharyi Region
 Ngapali Beach, Rakhine State
 Ngwesaung Beach, Ayeyarwady Region
 Sittwe Beach, Rakhine State

Netherlands
 Katwijk aan zee
 Maarsseveense plassen
 Noordwijk
 Scheveningen
 Zandvoort aan zee

Aruba

Eagle Beach
Palm Beach

Curacao 
 Coconut beach

New Zealand

 Allans Beach
 Anawhata
 Bayleys Beach
 Boulder Beach
 Breaker Bay
 Carters Beach
 Golden Bay
 Hot Water Beach
 Karekare
 Matapouri
 Muriwai
 Ninety Mile Beach
 Ocean Beach, Hawke's Bay
 Oreti Beach
 Papamoa
 Paraparaumu Beach
 Peka Peka
 Piha
 Red Beach
 St Clair and St Kilda Beaches, Dunedin
 Sandfly Bay
 Smaills Beach
 Snells Beach
 Te Henga (Bethells Beach)
 Tomahawk Beach
 Tunnel Beach
 Uretiti Beach
 Victory Beach
 Waihi Beach
 Whangarei Heads
 Whareakeake (Murdering Beach)
 Whatipu
 Worser Bay

Nicaragua

 Playa Escameca
 Playa el Yonke

Nigeria

Bar Beach, Lagos
Elegushi Beach
Kuramo Beach
Port Harcourt Tourist Beach

Norway

 Bleik
 Bystranda
 Hamresanden
 Hove
 Huk
 Hvervenbukta
 Mølen
 Møllebukta
 Sjøsanden
 Solastranda
 Vesterøya beaches

Mongolia

Lake Khovsgol beaches

Oman

Al Sawadi
Sur Beaches

Palestine

Pakistan

Astola Island
Cape Monze
Clifton Beach
French Beach
Gadani Beach
Gwadar Bay
Gwadar Beach
Hawke's Bay
Ibrahim Hyderi
Jiwani Bay
Korangi Creek
Kund Malir
Manora Beach
Nathia Gali Beach
 Ormara Beach
Ormara Turtle Beaches
Paradise Point
Sandspit Beach

Panama

Caribbean Coast
Isla Grande
Pacific Coast
Taboga

Papua New Guinea

Peru

 Ancón, Lima
 Barranco, Lima
 Contralmirante Villar, Tumbes
 Huanchaco, Trujillo
 Mancora, Piura
 La Punta, Callao
 Punta Hermosa, Lima
 Santa María del Mar, Lima

Philippines

Portugal

Puerto Rico

Crash Boat Beach
Flamenco Beach
Playa Jobos
Luquillo Beach
El Tuque Beach
La Guancha Beach
Pelicano Beach
Ensenadita Beach
Larga Beach
Blanca Beach
Guardia Costanera Beach
Carrucho Beach
Club Nautico Beach
Ponce Beach

Qatar

Romania

 Cap Aurora
 Costinesti
 Eforie Nord
 Eforie Sud
 Jupiter
 Mamaia
 Mangalia
 Navodari
 Neptun
 Olimp
 Saturn
 Venus

Russia
Curonian Spit
Lazurnaya Bay
Zelenogradsk

Saint Kitts and Nevis

Frigate Bay, Saint Kitts
Pinney's Beach, Nevis

Saint Lucia

The following are some of the most popular and well known beaches in the island nation of Saint Lucia:
Anse Chastanet beach on Chastanet Bay in Soufrière District
Anse Cochon beach on Cochon Bay in Canaries District
Anse de Sables beach in Vieux Fort District
Anse Louvet beach in Dennery District
Anse Mamin on Anse Bay in Soufrière District
Grande Anse beach in Gros Islet District
Laborie Bay in Laborie District
Marigot Bay in Castries District
Pigeon Island beach in Gros Islet District
Reduit Beach, Rodney Bay in Gros Islet District
La Toc Beach in Castries District
Vigie Beach, near the George F. L. Charles Airport in Castries District

Saint Vincent and the Grenadines

Mustique

Serbia

Ada Ciganlija, Belgrade
Bela Stena, Pančevo
Lido, Belgrade
Štrand, Novi Sad

Seychelles

Anse Lazio

Singapore

 

Changi Beach Park
East Coast Park
Palawan Beach, Siloso Beach & Tanjong Beach
West Coast Park

South Africa

Spain

Sri Lanka

Sweden

Laholm Bay Beach
Skrea strand

Taiwan 

 Baisha Bay
 Qixingtan Beach
 Fulong Beach
 Neipi Beach
 South Bay
 Yanliao Beach Park

Tanzania

 Zanzibar

Thailand

 Ao Nang, Krabi
 Haad Rin
 Ko Phi Phi Don
 Ko Phi Phi Leh
 Ko Tarutao
 Pattaya
 Phuket

Tonga
 Ha'apai

Trinidad and Tobago

 Cedros, Trinidad
 Chaguaramas, Trinidad
 Manzanilla Beach, Trinidad
 Maracas Beach, Trinidad
 Mayaro Bay, Trinidad
 Toco, Trinidad
 Englishman's Bay, Tobago
 Pigeon Point, Tobago

Tunisia

 Sounine

Turkey

Ukraine

 Arcadia Beach, Odessa (Odessa Oblast)
 Hydropark, Kyiv
 Trukhaniv Island, Kyiv

United Kingdom

United States

Uruguay

 La Pedrera, Rocha
 Malvín
 Piriápolis
 Pocitos
 Punta del Este

Vietnam

 Hạ Long Bay, Quảng Ninh Province
 Hội An, Quảng Nam Province
 Mũi Né, Bình Thuận Province
 Nha Trang, Khánh Hòa Province
 Phan Thiết, Bình Thuận Province
 Phú Quốc, Kiên Giang Province
 Vũng Tàu, Bà Rịa–Vũng Tàu province

See also

 Beach evolution
 Coast
 Coastal geography
 List of environment topics
 List of seaside resorts
 List of tourist attractions worldwide
 Nude beach
 Shore
 Urban beach

References

External links

World's Exotic Beaches
Best Beaches of Russia

.
 
Atlantic Ocean-related lists